Tharakan may refer to:

Title

 Tharakan (title), an honorific hereditary title for prominent Saint Thomas Christian families in Kerala, India
 Tharakan (Hindu caste), a Hindu caste from the Palakkad district of Kerala, India

Persons
 Thachil Matthoo Tharakan (1741–1814), influential Syrian Christian leader, minister, trader and exporter who played a major role in the history of erstwhile Travancore and Cochin kingdoms of modern-day Kerala, India
 Puthencavu Mathan Tharakan (1903 - 1993), Malayalam poet who earned the title Mahakavi
 K. M. Tharakan (1930–2003), critic, novelist, litterateur and educationalist from Kerala, India
 Hormis Tharakan, Indian Police Service officer from Kerala who was the chief of the Research and Analysis Wing (R&AW) of India during 2005–2007

See also
 Ezhupunna Tharakan, a 1989 Malayalam movie